Trouble the Water is a 2008 documentary film produced and directed by Tia Lessin and Carl Deal.  The film portrays a young couple surviving Hurricane Katrina, leading them to face their own troubled past during the storm's aftermath, in a community abandoned long before the hurricane hit. It features music by Massive Attack, Mary Mary, Citizen Cope, John Lee Hooker, The Roots, Dr. John and Blackkoldmadina. Trouble the Water is distributed by Zeitgeist Films and premiered in theaters in New York City and Los Angeles on August 22, 2008, followed by a national release.

Synopsis

Trouble the Water opens the day the filmmakers meet 24-year-old aspiring rap artist Kimberly Rivers Roberts and her husband Scott at a Red Cross shelter in central Louisiana, then flashes back two weeks, with Kimberly turning her new video camera on herself and her neighbors trapped in their Ninth Ward attic as the storm rages, the levees fail and the flood waters rise.

Weaving 15 minutes of Roberts' ground zero footage shot the day before and the morning of the storm, with archival news segments, other home videos, and verité footage they filmed over two years, director/producers Tia Lessin and Carl Deal document the journey of a young couple living on the margins who survive the storm and seize a chance for a new beginning.

Trouble the Water explores issues of race, class, and the relationship of the government to its citizens, issues that continue to haunt America, years after the levees failed in New Orleans.

Critical reception
The film appeared on several critics' top ten lists of the best films of 2008.

Subtitles
Trouble the Water was shown in France, with Celine Prost translating the French subtitles.

Awards and nominations
The film was nominated for an Academy Award for best documentary feature in 2009 and an Emmy Award for best informational program in 2010. It won the Grand Jury Prize: Documentary at the 2008 Sundance Film Festival
as well as the Grand Jury Award, The Kathleen Bryan Edwards Award for Human Rights, and the Working Films Award at the 2008 Full Frame Documentary Festival, and the Special Jury Prize at the 2008 AFI/Silverdocs Festival.

The film won the IFC Gotham Award for best documentary and the Council on Foundation's Henry Hampton Award. It has also been nominated for an NAACP Image award for outstanding documentary and a Producers Guild of America award.

The African-American Film Critics Association and the Alliance of Women Film Journalists named the film the best documentary of 2008, and it finished second in the National Film Critics Circle Award.

List of Awards
 2009 Academy Award  Nominee, Best Documentary Feature
 2009 Gotham Independent Film Award  for Best Documentary
 2009 NAACP Image Award Nominee, Outstanding Documentary
 2009 Producers Guild of America For Feature Documentary (Nominated)
 2008 Sundance Film Festival Grand Jury Prize
 2008 Full Frame Documentary Festival Grand Jury Prize
 2008 AFI/Silverdocs Special Jury Prize
 2008 Council On Foundations Henry Hampton Award for Excellence In Film And Digital Media
 2008 Working Films Award
 2008 Kathleen Bryan Human Rights Award
 2010 Harry Chapin Media Award
 Official Selection, 2008 New Directors/New Films Festival (Museum of Modern Art And Film Society of Lincoln Center)

References

External links
 
 Trouble the Water at Zeitgeist Films
 

2008 films
2008 documentary films
American documentary films
Documentary films about New Orleans
History of New Orleans
Documentary films about Hurricane Katrina
American independent films
Sundance Film Festival award winners
Lessin and Deal productions
2000s English-language films
2000s American films